Paul Hebert or Hébert may refer to:

Paul Octave Hébert (1818–1880), American politician and army general
Paul M. Hebert (1907–1977), American judge and former president of Louisiana State University
Paul Hébert (1924–2017), Canadian actor
Paul D. N. Hebert (born 1947), Canadian biologist

See also
Paul Ebert (1932–2009), director of the American College of Surgeons
Paul Herbert (disambiguation)
Paul Hiebert (writer) (1892–1987), Canadian writer and humorist